Krzemień is a peak in the Bieszczady mountains in south-east Poland.

Krzemień may also refer to:
Krzemień, Łódź Voivodeship (central Poland)
Krzemień, Białobrzegi County in Masovian Voivodeship (east-central Poland)
Krzemień, Maków County in Masovian Voivodeship (east-central Poland)
Krzemień, West Pomeranian Voivodeship (north-west Poland)
Krzemien., the standard author abbreviation for Polish botanist and microbiologist Helena Krzemieniewska (1878-1966)